William Elton "Bucky" Moore (May 5, 1905 – December 18, 1980) was an American football player who played two seasons in the National Football League with the Chicago Cardinals and Pittsburgh Pirates. He played college football at Loyola University New Orleans and attended Loyola High School in New Orleans, Louisiana. He was inducted into the Loyola Wolf Pack Hall of Fame in 1964. Morre was also nicknamed the "Dixie Flyer".

References

External links
Just Sports Stats

1905 births
1980 deaths
Players of American football from Mississippi
American football defensive backs
American football halfbacks
Loyola Wolf Pack football players
Chicago Cardinals players
Pittsburgh Pirates (football) players
People from McComb, Mississippi